Vunakapeake is a village located on the north coast of the Gazelle Peninsula on the island of New Britain,  East New Britain Province, Papua New Guinea. The village lies to the east of Lassul Bay and to the west of Ataliklikun Bay.

References

Populated places in East New Britain Province